Lake Silver, formerly known as Lake W is a private housing estate developed by MTR Corporation and Sino Land. It is located in Ma On Shan, Hong Kong between Wu Kai Sha station and  Monte Vista, another housing development. Lake Silver comprises a shopping centre with flats above.

Its advertising featured the song "Con Te Partirò" by Italian singer Andrea Bocelli.

Description
Lake Silver comprises seven residential blocks, 39 to 47 storeys each. The blocks form an L-shape in plan. They provide 2,218 units, with an average flat size 76 square metres. The shopping centre comprises 4,000 square metres, and the car park has 340 spaces. Projects to large units of the main two-bedroom flats start from  onwards, and to set up linked to double, even the roof and other characteristics of household units, the whole estate of more than 20 different types of intervals. Housing part of the club will be located in the MTR Wu Kai Sha station shelters, connected by two small split-bridge.

Standard units

 2 bedrooms -  - 753 feet
 2 rooms (multi-purpose room) -  - 805 feet
 3 bedrooms (master suite) -  - 920 feet
 3 bedrooms (master suite and multi-purpose room) -  - 1,046 feet
 3 bedrooms (master suite and multi-purpose rooms and workplaces) -  - 1,372 feet
 4 bedrooms (master suite and workplaces) - 
 4 bedrooms (two suites and workplaces) -  - 2,416 feet

Special units

Lake Palace

Lake Villa

Lake Sky

There are 14 such units (13 duplex units, one connected units), located in the top 1–8, by a  building area, the unique is that each unit attached to a private rooftop.

Lake Garden

Building design
Lake Silver of varying heights of each block, using a high ladder-type design, one of the most short, handed him to the stratigraphic sequence in each block, seven the highest, Lex and the MOS ridgeline tie. Unit size is also another consideration, the north (1,2,3,5 Block) unit, as it will be the next Lok Wo Sha block property projects landscape, it is 31 F, the following fully funded small units, because the building of more than 31 more than Lok Wo Sha The height is restricted to the project, hence the use of large units in the design. The east (7,8 Block) units, due to enjoy a permanent non-block landscape, it is all in order to enter the giant unit. 6 seats at the corner L-estate, with the north and the east wall, so blocks that contain both the size of the above-mentioned units.

Clubhouse

Hong Kong's first private club with islands (in the Wu Kai Sha station roof), the island is located three independent directors and a number of big houses and swimming pools. Club also has three banquet halls, including water Eden banquet hall, banquet hall and Ruby Sapphire Crown Royal Banquet Hall. Other facilities include 50-meter-long European lake-style outdoor swimming pool, indoor heated swimming pool, tree house Qinzileyuan, fitness room, outdoor children park, garden barbecue, indoor multipurpose stadium and so on.

False advertising
3 November 2009, Lake Silver TV ad days, has been Hong Kong Broadcasting Authority ruled that false and misleading. Council considered the licensee to submit relevant information and representations that: i the property of their value and popularity of the landscape is very important. Advertising can be imaginative ways to express, but the important property information must be accurate, should not have misleading. Ads at the end of the screen shows a panoramic view of the property. The end of the screen showed that the property is located in an environment surrounded by trees, but no other buildings nearby, the audience will think that this is a true description of the property, resulting in false and misleading advertising; and ii the licensee did not make reasonable efforts to determine the accuracy of the information in the ad. They should be available from the developer's "Property development information" and noted that the property adjacent to other housing estates, but the ad at the end of the screen does not show these buildings.

Walled design
Lake Silver days in order to "L" shaped buildings arranged in seven completely obscured behind the Monte Vista, but its completion is expected when the sea some premises will be Henderson Lok Wo Sha item block. The latter project is divided into 7, 25 3,335 households in between 10 and 32-storey level, is expected to Silver Lake and the lower middle class households in peak days, it is impossible to enjoy sea views.

References

External links

 

Residential buildings completed in 2009
Wu Kai Sha
Sino Group
MTR Corporation
Private housing estates in Hong Kong